Drowning Creek is a stream located in Estill County, Kentucky, United States.  It is a tributary of the Kentucky River.

References

Rivers of Estill County, Kentucky